Epsom and Ewell is a local government district with borough status and unparished area in Surrey, England, covering the towns of Epsom and Ewell. The borough was formed as an urban district in 1894, and was known as Epsom until 1934. It was made a municipal borough in 1937. The district was considered for inclusion in Greater London in 1965 but was left unaltered by the London Government Act 1963 and the Local Government Act 1972 in 1974. However, despite being outside modern Greater London the borough was in the Metropolitan Police District until it was transferred to Surrey Police in 2000. In the May 2019 elections, the borough was held by the Epsom and Ewell Residents Association with 32 seats, Labour with 3 seats, Liberal Democrats with 2 seats, and Conservatives with 1 seat.

Geography

The borough is at a range of elevations, scaling the lower slopes of the North Downs and drains into a large stream which springs above the surface in Ewell, the Hogsmill River which drains into the Thames at Kingston.  The borough comprises:
Ewell. Large village and suburban area. Contains the localities of West Ewell, East Ewell, Ewell Court and Ewell Downs
Epsom (which is a large post town which includes the above and reaches into Reigate and Banstead and Mole Valley). Epsom Downs Racecourse is in the extreme south east of the borough. Epsom Common is in the south west. 
Horton. Semi-rural area west of Epsom. 
Stoneleigh (except the far north of the suburb). Contains a large part of Nonsuch Park. 
Worcester Park (part) (Cuddington ward).
Langley Vale. Small village to the south of Epsom Downs
Horton. Large village located a mile to the west of Epsom. Contains Horton Country Park and Hobbledown.

A small portion of Cheam, including the eastern part of Nonsuch Park, as well as Nonsuch High School for Girls is in the eastern edge of the Borough.

Demography and economics
Much of the working population has middle (average) to upper-middle class levels of income.  As to housing estates, housing prices are highest in the less densely developed Downs areas including the immediate border area to Cheam and Banstead; only the north-east of Epsom has housing close to the national average price.   Its working class and its social housing recipients are concentrated most in the Ruxley and Court Wards of the Borough, among the most deprived in Surrey, but less so than the 50 most deprived wards of London.  The average house price from sales in May 2021 was £561,577.

History
Epsom and Ewell lies on the spring line on the north face of the North Downs where pervious chalk meets impervious London clay and a series of springs form. In Ewell the springs which form the Hogsmill River are evident, those in Epsom less so. The springs attracted prehistoric people and remains have been found, mostly in Ewell and particularly near the Hogsmill. In Roman times the road now known as Stane Street, from London to Chichester, passed through Epsom and Ewell. Roman remains have been found in Ewell suggesting a sizeable settlement. Epsom and Ewell have Saxon names: Ewell takes its name from the spring in the centre of the town and Epsom, or Ebbisham, is the enclosure of Ebbi. A Saxon cemetery in The Grove in Ewell was excavated in the 1930s.

In medieval times the area was covered by three manors: Cuddington, which was owned by the Codington family; Epsom, which belonged to Chertsey Abbey; and Ewell, associated with Merton Priory. In 1538 the village of Cuddington was destroyed to make way for Henry VIII's Nonsuch Palace and its parks. Henry died before the palace was complete but it was visited by his daughter Queen Elizabeth. It was demolished in 1682.

Epsom became a spa in the early 17th century when a spring containing Epsom salts was discovered on the Common. Its popularity with London society brought visits from Samuel Pepys and Nell Gwynne, the development of shops and inns and the oldest spa assembly rooms in England. This stands at the western end of Epsom High Street. Horse racing on Epsom Downs began during the spa period, but it was not until the Oaks was run in 1789 and the Derby the following year that it took on its present form. The first grandstand was built in 1830 and Queen's Stand in 1995.  The 1927 grandstand was demolished in 2007/8 and the new Duchess's Stand opened in its place in 2009.

Many large houses were built in Epsom during and after the spa period. St Martin's Church was rebuilt in 1825 and partly rebuilt in 1908 and the clock tower in the centre of the town replaced the earlier watchhouse in 1847. Ewell saw less change and, although now surrounded by suburbia. Its medieval church was replaced by the present Victorian one in 1848, but the medieval tower stands in the churchyard.

The Pre-Raphaelite painters, John Everett Millais and William Holman Hunt, had connections with both Ewell and Cuddington and used local scenes as backgrounds for a number of paintings, notably 'Ophelia' by Millais and 'The Light of the World' by Hunt.

In 1937, shortly after the creation of the current district, Epsom and Ewell was granted a coat of arms, which displays the district's link with horse racing and spas. It is: Per chevron vert and argent, in chief two horses heads erased or and in base as many bars wavy azure. The motto is "None Such", a pun on Nonsuch Palace.

In 1994 and 1995, minor alterations were made to the boundary of Epsom and Ewell with Greater London. This was first to better align the boundary with the Hogsmill River in West Ewell, as well as the roads in Stoneleigh.

Prior to 1995, the border followed the edge of old field boundaries not present since the development of Stoneleigh in the 1930s, causing the border to dissect roads, houses and gardens. There was very little net change in Epsom and Ewell's population. 

In 1995 Epsom and Ewell twinned with Chantilly in northern France, another racing town. Links are coordinated by Epsom and Ewell Town Twinning Association.

Transport
Railway stations in the borough include Epsom, Ewell East, Ewell West and Stoneleigh. Epsom Downs and Tattenham Corner stations sit on the borough borders. All Railway stations in the Borough have accepted the Oyster Card as payment and all except Epsom are in either fare zone 5 or 6. The borough is just north of, and entirely within, the M25 motorway. London Gatwick Airport is 20 miles south from Epsom. Numerous bus services run through Ewell into Epsom town centre such as TfL services 293, 418, 406, 166, 470 and Surrey County Council subsidised services 460, 480, 318, Epsom local area routes E5 and E16. Most services were previously run by Quality Line however since the takeover of Epsom Coaches by the RATP Group, the Surrey County Council and commercial services have been contracted to different operators such as Falcon Buses and the now defunct Buses Excetera (also known as Coaches Excetera) or have been axed entirely.

Politics

Epsom and Ewell is one of the few councils dominated by a group not linked to a national political party. Epsom and Ewell Residents Association has dominated the council since the foundation of the borough. Epsom and Ewell Parliamentary Constituency is one of the most Conservative seats and contains the entirety of the borough. As the population is not large enough for a full seat, it has also contained neighbouring areas. Since 1997 it also contains Ashtead, part of the Mole Valley district. Before boundaries changed in 1997 the constituency instead contained Banstead to the east, which is part of Reigate and Banstead borough.

Education
The Borough of Epsom and Ewell has several secondary schools; Glyn School, Epsom and Ewell High School, Rosebery School for Girls and Blenheim High School. In addition it also has two private, fee paying schools; Epsom College and Ewell Castle School.
The borough also contains a special school for children and young people with autism and social communication difficulties; Linden Bridge School, in Worcester Park.

Further education
North East Surrey College of Technology

Higher education
University for the Creative Arts

Future40 
In September 2018, the council launched Future40, a brand-new initiative to develop a long-term vision of the borough. Everyone who lives, works, visits or studies in Epsom and Ewell is being encouraged to take part in the largest and most important consultations in the borough's history, with questions being asked about what the borough should look and feel like by the year 2040 and beyond. The consultation period is now open and feedback will be accepted until 20 December 2018.

References

 
Non-metropolitan districts of Surrey
Unparished areas in Surrey
Coast to Capital Local Enterprise Partnership
Boroughs in England